Gabriel Tambon (23 March 1930 – 27 December 2015) was a French politician for the Union for a Popular Movement (UMP). He served as the Mayor of Le Castellet, Var from 1965 until his death. He was born in Castellet, Vaucluse.

References

1930 births
2015 deaths
Mayors of places in Provence-Alpes-Côte d'Azur
People from Vaucluse
Union for a Popular Movement politicians